Craig William Leslie McCauley is an Anglican priest: he has been  Archdeacon of Kilmore since 2010.

McCauley was born in 1972 and educated at Glamorgan University and Trinity College Dublin. He was  ordained after a period of study at the Church of Ireland Theological College in 2000. His first posts were curacies at Seapatrick and Kill. After that he has been the Incumbent at Lurgan from 2004.

References

1972 births
Living people
Archdeacons of Kilmore
Alumni of the University of Glamorgan
Alumni of Trinity College Dublin
Alumni of the Church of Ireland Theological Institute